Brendan Evans and Toshihide Matsui were the defending champions, but Evans decided not to play this year.
Matsui teams up with Divij Sharan, but lost in the second round to Im Kyu-tae and Danai Udomchoke.
Kyu-tae and Udomchoke went on to lose the final 0–6, 3–6 against John Paul Fruttero and Raven Klaasen.

Seeds

Draw

Draw

References
 Main Draw

Fergana Challenger - Doubles
2011 Doubles